United Orient Bank is an American bank established to serve the Chinese-American community of New York City.  Headquartered in New York City, with branch offices in Chinatown, Manhattan, the bank is privately-held and claims itself as the first indigenous community bank in Chinatown, Manhattan when it was established on April 9, 1981.

The slogan of the bank is: “to put the area's resources to work locally”.  It was one of the first US Banks established to serve the Chinese community in the United States as well as one of the first to provide Individual Retirement Accounts for its clients.

In August 1987, the United Orient Bank was indicted by a federal grand jury in Manhattan for failing to report cash transactions exceeding $10,000. The indictment was pronounced by Rudolph Giuliani, then the US Attorney for the Southern District of New York.

In 1995, Yungman Lee was named President and CEO of the United Orient Bank, where he served by seven years.

Governance 

 1994–1995: William D. Hoffman (President and CEO)
 1995–2002: Yungman Lee (President and CEO)

References

External links
United Orient Bank homepage

1981 establishments in New York City
Banks based in New York City
Banks established in 1981
Chinese American banks
Chinese-American culture in New York City
Companies based in Manhattan
Privately held companies based in New York City